Doina Spîrcu ( Craciun, born 24 July 1970 in Slobozia) is a Romanian rower. She competed at the 1996 Olympics under her married name.

References

External links
 

1970 births
Living people
Romanian female rowers
People from Slobozia
Olympic gold medalists for Romania
Rowers at the 1996 Summer Olympics
Rowers at the 2000 Summer Olympics
Olympic rowers of Romania
Olympic medalists in rowing
World Rowing Championships medalists for Romania
Medalists at the 1996 Summer Olympics